Charles Lemaire (1863 – 1926) was a Belgian officer and explorer of Central Africa.  He was known not only for his voyages of discovery and the detailed reports he wrote about them, but for the brutality of his administration. Lemaire was also the first director of the Colonial University of Belgium which existed in Antwerp from 1920 to 1962, and was the first true promoter of Esperanto in Belgium.

Biography 

Charles Lemaire was born in Cuesmes on March 26, 1863. Captain in the 2nd Belgian artillery regiment, he made four stays in the Congo, where he was colonial administrator between 1889 and 1893. His administration brutally oversaw the rubber production industry. He advised his regime to cut the hands, noses, and ears off of unproductive workers. He personally admitted to burning down several Congolese villages, and had his troops murder dozens of natives.

Lemaire carried out cartographic work in Katanga between 1898 and 1900. Appointed captain-commander in 1902, he explored Bhar-El-Ghazal with  before returning to Europe in 1905 via the Nile. 

Between April and September 1898, Lemaire's expedition was accompanied by photographer and taxidermist François Michel (1855 – 1932). He was in charge of taking photos of the expedition along the way, and building up a natural history collection. Other members of the expedition included caravan leader Justin Maffei, Belgian painter , and geologists Jean De Windt and William Caisley. They started at the East African coast, to Moliro and Lake Dilolo, following the Congo River and ending on the west coast of the continent. Apart from a few Europeans, the expedition was made up of hundreds of Africans engaged as porters, laundresses or soldiers. 

Accused of abuse towards the native soldiers, and guilty of mistreatment of the civilian population, he was demoted and retired in disgrace, before coming out of retirement in 1920 to direct the Colonial University of Belgium. He was elected an associate member of the Académie des sciences coloniales in 1923.

He died in Brussels on January 21, 1926.

Awards and legacy 

Lemaire was named an Officer of the Order of Leopold and Commander of the Order of the Crown.

Two species of fish from Lake Tanganyika, Grammatotria lemairii and Lamprologus lemairii, have been named after him. The Lemaire Channel is also named for him.

Publications 

 1894: Congo et Belgique: (à propos de l'Exposition d'Anvers) / par le lieutenant Lemaire, Ch.
 1895: Au Congo: comment les noirs travaillent, par le lieutenant Lemaire, Ch.
 1898-1900: Etat indépendant du Congo. Mission scientifique du Ka-Tanga. Itinéraire parcouru du 5 août 1898 au 2 mars 1900 / Observateurs le lieutenant Ch. Lemaire
 1901: Mission scientifique du Ka-Tanga: résultats des observations astronomiques, magnétiques et altimétriques effectuées sur le territoire de l'État indépendant du Congo / par le capitaine Lemaire, Charles, Bulens éditeur, Bruxelles.

References 

Commanders of the Order of the Crown (Belgium)

Belgian cartographers
19th-century Belgian military personnel

20th-century Belgian military personnel

1863 births
1926 deaths